Peter Goodwright (12 May 1936 – 2 November 2020) was an English comedic impressionist. He appeared on the ITV impressions show Who Do You Do? in the 1970s. Goodwright was born in Haslington, Cheshire.

Career
Goodwright has been referred to as "the godfather of impressionists". On radio in the 1950s, he appeared in The Clitheroe Kid and the last episode of Hancock's Half Hour; where he impersonated Tony Hancock as he specialised in impersonating radio performers. As well as Who Do You Do?, he made several television appearances, including on Jokers Wild. He was a panel member on the BBC Radio 2 comedy game The Impressionists and appeared on the Royal Variety Performance in 1987. He worked with Harry Enfield in the spoof documentary biopic Norbert Smith: A Life in 1989, and also appeared on stage in farces by Ray Cooney.

His death, aged 84, was reported in November 2020.

References

External links

 

1936 births
2020 deaths
English impressionists (entertainers)
People from Cheshire
People from Haslington